Angela Veronese  (20 December 1778 - 8 October 1847) was an Italian poet.

Biography
Angela Veronese was born in Montebelluna, 20 December 1778. Her parents were Pietro Rinaldo and Lucia.

When she was very young, she moved first to Treviso (in the villa of Ca 'Zenobio), and then to Venice where she contracted smallpox. In Venice, she was expelled from a female college. She remained in Venice under the auspices of the Zenobio counts, on whose behalf her family worked. In this period, she became fond of poetry, beginning to compose sonnets and other rhymes, which she collected under the name of Aglaia Anassillide (or Aglaja Anassillide), taken from the Arcadian tradition. Veronese is one of the significant writers in the history of early nineteenth-century Italian literature and is therefore registered in "Le Autrici della Letteratura Italiana" (The Authors of Italian Literature). She died in Padua, 8 October 1847.

Selected works 
 Rime pastorali di Aglaja Anassillide, Brescia, Niccolò Bettoni 1807
 Alcune poesie pastorali edite ed inedite di Aglaja Anassillide, Venezia, Picottiani 1819
 Versi di Aglaja Anassillide, aggiuntevi le notizie della sua vita scritte da lei medesima, Padova, Crescini 1826
 Poesie scelte d'italiani viventi, Venezia, Girolamo Tasso 1844
 Eurosia, Milano, Santo Bravetta 1836
 Notizie della sua vita scritte da lei medesima. Rime scelte, a cura di M. Pastore Stocchi, Firenze, Le Monnier 1973

References

Bibliography
 Augusto Serena, Appunti letterari, Roma 1903
 Mario Fubini, Angela Veronese, «Notizie della sua vita scritte da lei medesima. Rime scelte», in «Giornale storico della Letteratura italiana», CL, 472, 1973
 Ginetta Auzzas, Ricordi personali e memoria del Veneto, in AA. VV., Storia della cultura veneta. VI. Dall'età napoleonica alla prima guerra mondiale, Vicenza, Neri Pozza 1986
 Giovanna Pastega, Angela Veronese (Aglaia Anassillide), in AA. VV., Le stanze ritrovate. Antologia di scrittrici venete dal Quattrocento al Novecento, Mirano-Venezia, Eidos 1991

1778 births
1847 deaths
Italian women poets
19th-century Italian poets
19th-century Italian women writers